Edward Mount (18 January 1875 – 1938) was a Scottish professional footballer who played as a wing half.

References

External links
Photo of Cambuslang Hibs squad featuring Mount (Ed Boyle Cambuslang Photos)

1875 births
1938 deaths
Sportspeople from Cambuslang
Scottish footballers
Association football wing halves
Cambuslang Hibernian F.C. players
Grimsby Town F.C. players
English Football League players
Footballers from South Lanarkshire